Philip Lang may refer to:
 Philip J. Lang (1911–1986), American musical arranger, orchestrator and composer of band music
 Phil Lang (Philip David Lang, born 1929), American politician in the Oregon House of Representatives

See also
 Philip Lange (1756-1805), Danish architect and master mason